Storsjön may refer to:

 Storsjön, lake in Jämtland
 Storsjön, Gästrikland